Mug Travel (known as My Friend Bernard in English) is a 2007 South Korean computer-animated film, directed by Lim Ah-ron and based on his animated TV series, Bernard.

Plot 
A little girl named Bebe (known as Sam in the English version), all alone on Christmas Eve, is given a magical pendant from Santa Claus and embarks on a fantastical adventure. Travelling in a mug with the power of teleportation, Bebe explores a variety of exotic locations from the desert to the North Pole, accompanied by a host of characters including Backkom the polar bear (Bernard in the English version) and Kongkong the penguin (Lloyd in the English version), Bebe and her friends go on a series of adventures through an Arctic tundra and a desert oasis. During this trip they encounter a variety of challenges, including a sea monster, a skiing adventure, and an ominous cave.

Production 
Produced by RG Animation Studios and directed by Lim Ah-ron, Mug Travel is a feature film adaptation of Lim's computer-animated TV series Backkom. The film and TV series were made at the same time on a combined budget of $5.9 million, after Lim noticed a gap in the market for shows aimed at preschool children.

Release 
Mug Travel was released in South Korea on 22 March 2007, and was ranked eighth at the Korean box office on its opening weekend with 48,244 admissions. Over the course of its theatrical run, the film accumulated a total of 135,261 admissions nationwide, and grossed $608,835.

Mug Travel was screened at the Fifth Bimini Animation Festival, held in Latvia in March 2007, where it was the winner of "The Best Film for Children" award. It was subsequently selected to participate in the non-competition category at the Brussels International Festival of Fantastic Film, which ran from 5–17 April 2007 in Belgium.

See also 
 Korean animation
 List of Christmas films

References

External links 
   (Dead link)
 
 

2007 films
2007 computer-animated films
South Korean children's films
South Korean Christmas films
2000s children's animated films
2000s Christmas films
South Korean animated films
2000s Korean-language films
Films about polar bears
Animated films about penguins
Films about lizards
2000s South Korean films